Apollo is an English-language monthly magazine covering the visual arts of all periods from antiquity to the present day.

History and profile
Apollo was founded in 1925, in London. The contemporary Apollo features a mixture of reviews, art-world news and scholarly articles. It has been described as "The International Magazine for Collectors". Apollo is owned by the Barclay brothers through the Press Holdings Media Group company.

The magazine rewards excellence in arts through annual Apollo Magazine Awards.

In the United States the magazine advertising and subscriptions was managed entirely by Valerie Allan from 1968 to 2008 first from New York then, starting in 1972, from Los Angeles.

Content
In line with its reputation as a magazine for collectors, Apollo regularly reports on museum acquisitions and international art fairs, including The European Fine Art Fair (TEFAF) in Maastricht, Netherlands, and Frieze Art Fair in London's Regent's Park, as well as publishing profiles on eminent collectors, such as Eli Broad, the Duke of Devonshire, Anita Zabludowich, Robert H. Smith, Sheihka Hussah al-Sabah and Charles Ryskamp.

Along with regular news and reviews, the magazine has published interviews with contemporary artists including Howard Hodgkin, Marc Quinn, Antony Gormley and architect Norman Foster.

The end-of-year Apollo Awards include one for "Personality of the Year"; in 2011 the winner was Sir Mark Jones, former director of the Victoria and Albert Museum.

Recent collaborative editions have included special issues in partnership with the J. Paul Getty Museum and the Yale Center for British Art. The current editor is Edward Behrens and regular contributors include Martin Gayford, Alan Powers, Emma Crichton-Miller, Simon Grant, Vincent Katz and art-market correspondent Susan Moore.

Regular features
 Agenda: A guide to what's on worldwide
 News: Developments in the world of art and architecture
 Exhibitions: In-depth reviews of international exhibitions
 Books: Recommendations and reviews of recent and forthcoming publications

Editors
 R. Sidney Glover: 1925–29
 Thomas Leman Hare: 1929–35
 Herbert Furst: 1935–43
 William Jennings: 1943–45
 Horace Shipp: 1945–56
 Wynne Jeudwine: 1956–59
 William Jennings: 1959–60
 Denys Sutton: 1962–87
 Anna Somers Cocks: 1987–90
 Robin Simon: 1990–97
 David Ekserdjian: 1997–2004
 Michael Hall: 2004–10
 Oscar Humphries: 2010–13
 Thomas Marks: 2013–2021
 Edward Behrens: 2021–present

Previous owners
 Lord Duveen and Tancred Borenius: 1925–29
 The Apollo Press (publishers): 1929–33
 The Field Group: 1933–39
 William Jennings: 1939–60
 H. W. Finnegan Jennings: 1960–62
 Financial Times Business Information: 1962–84
 Algy Cluff and Naim Attallah (Namara Group): 1984–90
 Investment company co-owned by the Flick family: 1990–92
 Paul Josefowitz: 1992–2002
 The Telegraph Group (owned by Conrad Black): 2002–03
 Press Holdings Media Group Ltd (owned by the Barclay brothers): 2003–present

References

External links
 Apollo homepage
 

1925 establishments in the United Kingdom
Art history journals
Visual arts magazines published in the United Kingdom
Monthly magazines published in the United Kingdom
Contemporary art magazines
Magazines published in London
Magazines established in 1925
Press Holdings